Damyang County (Damyang-gun) is a county in Jeollanam-do, South Korea. Tourism is a major local industry.  Notable local products include bamboo goods and strawberries.

Damyang is not to be confused with Danyang, which is located in eastern North Chungcheong Province.

Geography 

The county comprises one eup (Damyang-eup, the seat), and eleven myeon (Bongsan-myeon, Changpyeong-myeon, Daedeok-myeon, Daejeon-myeon, Geumseong-myeon, Goseo-myeon, Mujeong-myeon, Nam-myeon, Subok-myeon, Wolsan-myeon, Yong-myeon).

Mountains 
Chuwolsan and Byeongpungsan are popular hiking destinations. Also notable for its fortress (Geumseongsanseong): Geumseongsan.

Climate

Flora

Bamboo 
Damyang is one of the northernmost places where bamboo can be found on the Korean peninsula, and its bamboo forests are well-known among Koreans. Many touristic attractions have been created to leverage that reputation: a Bamboo Theme Park / Daenamugol, a Bamboo Museum, a Bamboo Festival, a park filled with green bamboo (Juknokwon - 죽녹원).

Metasequoia 
A stretch of metasequoia trees just outside Damyang-eup, planted during the Park Chung-Hee administration in the 1970s, has a long walking path of about two kilometers. The trees are particularly striking in late October to early November when their leaves turn bright colors. The walk gained nationwide popularity after a romantic drama was shot here. It was even picked as one of the most beautiful roads in all of Korea.

Culture

Food 
Jeollanam-do enjoys a good reputation for its cuisine, and Damyang provides a large choice of restaurants.
The most popular specialities include Damyang ddeok galbi (tteokgalbi): this tasty and juicy marinated beef and pork mix, usually grilled at the table, is supposed to have originated either in Damyang or in Gwangju.
Bamboo foods served at restaurants in Damyang include daetongbap (rice cooked in bamboo), tea places bamboo tea and the salad of raw bamboo with spicy vinegar.

Literature 
Several houses of famous scholars can be visited, and the Miam Diaries (Miam Yu Hui-chun: 1513–1577) are preserved in Daeduk-myon.

Events 
Damyang Bamboo Festival
The V Asian-Pacific Astronomy Olympiad took place in Damyang in October 2009.

Dramas 
Korean dramas have become a significant source of revenue for tourism, and many counties sponsor series or compete to host a few shootings, hoping to hit a jackpot similar to the localities 'blessed' with Winter Sonata's visit. Damyang boasts its metasequoia path (see above), and a 'movie village'.

Landmarks and Monuments 
They include the fortress of Geumseongsanseong, and various national treasures (pagodas, pavilions... - overall, 66 properties, including 15 at the national level and 51 at the provincial level).

Infrastructure has followed the natural assets, and tourists can stay in themed resorts with local features such as hot baths perfumed with bamboo.

Temples 
Yongheungsa in Wolsa-myeon (not to be confused with Busan's Yonggungsa)
Gaeseonsa in Nam-myeon.

Soswaewon 
A private garden built by Yang San-bo (1503–1557), Soswaewon (소쇄원) stretches along a charming streamlet dotted with pavilions particularly suitable for meditation. A refreshing spot in the summer heat.

Juknokwon 
Juknokwon was opened on May, 2003. This bamboo grove is 310,0002 wide. There are 8 trails which have different themes. And it was filming location of 'R-Point'.

Gwanbangjerim 
Gwanbangjerim is a forest created to protect Gwanbangje, an embankment along Damyangcheon Stream. It is designated as Natural Monument No. 366, and about 320 deciduous broadleaf trees of 15 species remain.

Sister cities 
 Anji, China
 Takehara, Japan
 Lynnwood, Washington, United States

See also 
 Jeollanam-do
 Administrative divisions of South Korea
 Geography of South Korea

References

External links 

 
County government page

 
Counties of South Jeolla Province